Mezina is a municipality and village in Bruntál District in the Moravian-Silesian Region of the Czech Republic. It has about 400 inhabitants.

History
Mezina was founded in 1258.

According to the Austrian census of 1910, the village had 621 inhabitants, all of them were German-speaking. Most populous religious group were Roman Catholics with 616 (99.2%).

References

External links

Villages in Bruntál District